Patterson Heights is a borough in north-central Beaver County, Pennsylvania, United States. The population was 637 at the 2020 census. It is a part of the Pittsburgh metropolitan area.

Geography
Patterson Heights is located in north-central Beaver County at  (40.739029, -80.328050).

Surrounding and adjacent neighborhoods
Patterson Heights has two land borders, including Beaver Falls to the northeast and Patterson Township to the south, west and northwest.  Across the Beaver River to the east, Patterson Heights run adjacent with New Brighton.

Demographics

As of the census of 2000, there were 670 people, 256 households, and 199 families residing in the borough. The population density was 2,757.4 people per square mile (1,077.9/km²). There were 268 housing units at an average density of 1,103.0 per square mile (431.1/km²). The racial makeup of the borough was 96.57% White, 0.30% African American, 0.45% Asian, 1.04% from other races, and 1.64% from two or more races. Hispanic or Latino of any race were 1.34% of the population.

There were 256 households, out of which 29.7% had children under the age of 18 living with them, 69.1% were married couples living together, 6.3% had a female householder with no husband present, and 21.9% were non-families. 19.9% of all households were made up of individuals, and 9.4% had someone living alone who was 65 years of age or older. The average household size was 2.62 and the average family size was 3.02.

In the borough the population was spread out, with 25.7% under the age of 18, 4.5% from 18 to 24, 23.4% from 25 to 44, 26.6% from 45 to 64, and 19.9% who were 65 years of age or older. The median age was 43 years. For every 100 females, there were 91.4 males. For every 100 females age 18 and over, there were 87.9 males.

The median income for a household in the borough was $49,917, and the median income for a family was $52,411. Males had a median income of $39,250 versus $31,771 for females. The per capita income for the borough was $21,244. About 7.7% of families and 6.6% of the population were below the poverty line, including 6.6% of those under age 18 and 9.2% of those age 65 or over.

Education
Children in Patterson Heights are served by the Blackhawk School District. The current schools serving Patterson Heights are:
 Patterson Primary School –  grades K-2
 Blackhawk Intermediate School – grades 3-5
 Highland Middle School – grades 6-8
 Blackhawk High School – grades 9-12

Public services
Patterson Heights has a small volunteer fire department consisting of roughly 25 members. The Patterson Heights Volunteer Fire Department was incorporated November 4, 1903, making it Beaver County's first incorporated fire department. Patterson Heights does not have a police department. Police protection is contracted to the Patterson Township Police Department.

References

External links
Borough of Patterson Heights official website
Patterson Heights Volunteer Fire Department

Populated places established in 1899
Pittsburgh metropolitan area
Boroughs in Beaver County, Pennsylvania
1899 establishments in Pennsylvania